Mekwei (Menggwei), or Moi, is a Papuan language of Jayapura Regency, Indonesia. It is spoken in Kendate, Maribu, Sabron Dosay, and Waibrong villages.

References

Nimboran languages
Languages of western New Guinea